University of Copenhagen Arctic Station is a year-round, environmental research facility in central West Greenland. The main building and the laboratory are within a nature sanctuary.
It was founded in 1906 by the botanist Morten Pedersen Porsild, and has since 1953 been owned by the University of Copenhagen Faculty of Science.

The facility was renovated and expanded in the years 2019 - 2022 by Dissing+Weitling. The modernisation included new laboratories, storing facilities and extra sleeping accommodation for 39 people in total.

See also
List of research stations in the Arctic

References

External links

 Official website

University of Copenhagen
Research stations in Greenland
Qeqertalik
Disko Island
Qeqertarsuaq
Educational institutions established in 1906
1906 establishments in Greenland